The Surti is a breed of water buffalo found in the Kaira and Vadodara districts of Gujarat between the Mahi and Sabarmati rivers. Its average milk yield is 1600-1800 litres. The fat content of the milk is about 8-10 percent. The best animals of this breed are found in Anand, Kaira and Baroda districts of Gujarat.

Sickle shape horn is its characteristic feature.

Characteristics of the breed

The Surti buffalo is of medium size and docile temperament. The breed has got a fairly broad and long head with a convex shape at the top in between horns. Horns are sickle-shaped and flat which grow in a downward & backward direction and then upwards at the tip forming a hook. The skin is black or brown. Surti breed has got a unique straight back. Good specimens have two white collars.

Performance of the breed
 
Average milk production:-
Ist Lactation:-1500-1600 kg
Other than Ist Lactation:- 1900–2000 kg

Fat:- 7 to 7.5%

SNF:- 9 to 9.15%

Age at Ist calving:- 45 to 47 months

Calving interval:- 400 to 425 days

Breeding period:- Seasonal (Sept. to April)

References

Bovines
Water buffalo breeds originating in India
Animal husbandry in Gujarat
Surat